This is a list of former sports teams from the US state of Idaho:

Baseball

Minor League

Northwest League
Boise A's (1975, 1976)
Boise Buckskins (1978)
Lewiston Broncs (1955–74, and WIL: 1952–54)

Pioneer League
Boise Braves (1955–63)
Boise Pilots (1939–42, 1946–51, 1954)
Boise Yankees (1952, 1953)
Caldwell Cubs (1967–72), Treasure Valley Cubs (1964–66)
Idaho Falls Padres (2000–03), were also known as the Idaho Falls Braves (1993–99), Idaho Falls Gems (1992), Idaho Falls Braves (1986–1991, Idaho Falls Nuggets (1985), Idaho Falls A's (1982–1984),Idaho Falls Angels (1978–1981), they are now called the Idaho Falls Chukars
Lewiston Indians (1939) 
Magic Valley Cowboys (1952–58, 1961–66, 1968–71), Twin Falls Cowboys (1939–42, 1946–51)
Pocatello Athletics
Pocatello Cardinals
Pocatello Chiefs (1962–65), Pocatello Bannocks (1952–60, 1961), Pocatello Giants (1960)
Pocatello Gems
Pocatello Pioneers
Pocatello Posse

NCAA
 Boise State Broncos (1971–1980, 2020)
 Idaho Vandals (190x–1980)
 Idaho State Bengals (195x–1974)

Basketball

Continental Basketball Association
 Idaho Stampede (1997–2006)

NBA Development League
 Idaho Stampede (2006–16)

Football

Indoor Professional Football League
Idaho Stallions (1999–2001)

Soccer

National Premier Soccer League
Idaho Wolves (2004)

Tennis

World TeamTennis
Idaho Sneakers (1994-2000)

See also
 List of defunct Florida sports teams
 List of defunct Georgia sports teams
 List of defunct Mississippi sports teams
 List of defunct Ohio sports teams
 List of defunct Pennsylvania sports teams

Idaho
Idaho sports-related lists